This is the discography for American R&B-jazz musician Allen Toussaint.

Albums

Studio albums 
The Wild Sound of New Orleans (1958)
Toussaint (1971, aka From A Whisper To A Scream)
Life, Love and Faith (1972)
Southern Nights (1975)
Motion (1978)
I Love A Carnival Ball, Mr Mardi Gras Starring Allen Toussaint (1987)
Connected (1996)
A New Orleans Christmas (1997)
Allen Toussaint's Jazzity Project: Going Places (2004)
The Bright Mississippi (2009)
American Tunes (2016)

Live album 
Songbook (2013)
 Numerous concert recordings from the annual New Orleans Jazz & Heritage Festival

Compilations 
The Allen Toussaint Collection (1991)
Finger Poppin' & Stompin' Feet (2002)
The Complete Warner Bros. Recordings (2005)

Collaborations
 Cahoots (Capitol Records, 1971), The Band (Brass Arrangements on Life is a Carnival)
Desitively Bonnaroo (Atco Records, 1974), with Dr. John and The Meters.
King Biscuit Boy (also known as The Brown Derby Album) (Epic Records, 1974), with King Biscuit Boy and The Meters. 
Venus and Mars (Capitol Records, 1975), with Wings.
Notice to Appear (ABC Records, 1976), with John Mayall: seven of the 10 songs by Toussaint, who also plays piano, clavinet, Fender Rhodes piano and RMI percussion. 
New Orleans Heat (1978), with Albert King
Luxury You Can Afford (1978), with Joe Cocker
Changes (1980), with Etta James
Released (1980), with Patti LaBelle
The Definition of Soul (1997), with Solomon Burke
A Taste Of New Orleans (1999), with various artists (credited to 'Allen Toussaint & Friends')
I Believe To My Soul (2005), with various artists
The River in Reverse, with Elvis Costello (2006)
Goin' Home: A Tribute to Fats Domino (Vanguard, 2007); duet, with Paul McCartney, of "I Want to Walk You Home"
I Know I've Been Changed (2010), with Aaron Neville
Clapton (2010), with Eric Clapton
Memphis Blues (2010), with Cyndi Lauper
Wrote a Song for Everyone (2013), with John Fogerty

Source:

Singles

Chart hit compositions

Other compositions credited as Naomi Neville
Real Man (1961)
Do-Re-Mi (1961)
Get Out Of My House (1962)
Hey, Hey, Hey (1962)
What Are You Trying To Do (1965)
Meter Strut (1970)
Hello My Lover (1972)
I Did My Part (1981)
Work, Work, Work (1995)
Source:

Other compositions credited as Clarence Toussaint
True Love Never Dies (1961)

Other songs
Aaron Neville recorded his song "Hercules" as a single in 1973. Boz Scaggs recorded "Hercules" for his album Slow Dancer. Paul Weller covered "Hercules" on the 2004 album Studio 150.
Van Dyke Parks recorded "Occapella" and "Riverboat" on his second album Discover America in 1972. Ringo Starr recorded "Occapella" in 1974 on his album Goodnight Vienna. "Occapella" was also recorded by The Manhattan Transfer on their 1975 self-titled album.
The Band recorded "You See Me" on their Jubilation album (1998).
Little Feat recorded "On Your Way Down" on the album Dixie Chicken. The band performed the song during their 1974 tour; it appears as a bonus track on the re-release of their live album, Waiting for Columbus. The Tommy Talton Band recorded "On Your Way Down" in 2009 for the album Live Notes From Athens.
Bonnie Raitt recorded "What Is Success" in 1974 on her Streetlights LP, and "What Do You Want the Boy to Do?" in 1975, on Home Plate.
Bo Diddley recorded "Going Down" in 1972 on his album The London Bo Diddley Sessions.
Boz Scaggs recorded "Hello My Lover" on his 1972 album My Time, and "What Do You Want the Girl to Do?" for his 1976 album Silk Degrees.
Lowell George recorded "What Do You Want the Girl to Do?" for his 1979 solo album Thanks, I'll Eat it Here.
Robert Palmer recorded "Sneakin' Sally Through The Alley" and "From A Whisper To A Scream" on the album Sneakin' Sally Through the Alley in 1974. Palmer also recorded "River Boat" for the album Pressure Drop in 1975, and "Night People" for the album Double Fun in 1978.
Ringo Starr recorded "Sneakin' Sally Through The Alley" in 1977 on his album Ringo the 4th. 
Phish covered "Sneakin' Sally Through The Alley" as well as "On Your Way Down" numerous times in concert, dating as far back as 1985.
Helen Reddy covered "Optimism Blues" on her 1981 album Play Me Out.
Glen Campbell covered "You Will Not Lose" on his 1990 CD Walkin' In The Sun, as a duet with Steve Wariner.
Widespread Panic covered "On Your Way Down" in 2009 and also at their 2010 New Orleans Jazz & Heritage Festival Performance. Trombone Shorty covered "On Your Way Down" on his 2010 CD Backatown, featuring Toussaint on piano.
 The song "I Feel Good", written under the pseudonym Naomi Neville and originally released in the US by Benny Spellman (1965), was a major hit in New Zealand for Larry's Rebels (1966) and later Citizen Band (Studio and live versions – 1978). It was recorded by Greg Anderson (Australia, 1966), Chants R&B (New Zealand 1966 live recording, released 2008), The Artwoods (UK, 1966 – Single on Decca by R&B band led by Art Wood, brother of Ron Wood. Members included Jon Lord, later of Deep Purple), The Kuhtze Band (New Zealand, 1987), The Gavin Burgess Band (1997 Live recording, released 2012).

Video 
 Make It Funky! (2005)
 Putting the River in Reverse (DVD) (2006)
 Piano Players Rarely Ever Play Together (DVD, 1982), by Nell Palfi and Pauline Waring, Stevenson Productions 001 (Winner of over 20 Awards, also features Isidore "Tuts" Washington and Henry "Professor Longhair" Byrd)
 Music Conversation: Allen Toussaint & Larry Appelbaum
 Allen Toussaint: The Soul of New Orleans (DVD, 2011) American Music Research Foundation

References

Discographies of American artists
Jazz discographies